Terisa Telesia Ngobi is a New Zealand politician of the Labour Party.

Early life
Born in Levin, she is of Samoan and Scottish descent. She has spent 16 years working for government and non-profit organisations.

Political career

A member of the ruling centre-left Labour Party, she was elected the Member of the Parliament for Ōtaki in 2020 election, defeating the National candidate Tim Costley by a margin of 2,988 votes.

References

External links 
 Terisa Ngobi on Facebook

Living people
New Zealand Labour Party MPs
Year of birth missing (living people)
People from Levin, New Zealand
New Zealand people of Samoan descent
New Zealand people of Scottish descent
21st-century New Zealand women politicians